By-elections to the 20th Canadian Parliament were held to fill vacancies in the House of Commons of Canada between the 1945 federal election and the 1949 federal election. The Liberal Party of Canada led a working majority government for the 20th Canadian Parliament, though was technically a minority government during World War II.

Shortly before the dissolution of the 20th Canadian Parliament, Newfoundland joined Confederation as the tenth province. Unlike the case when the provinces such as Manitoba, British Columbia and Prince Edward Island joined, by-elections were not called to fill the new province's seven seats.

Eighteen vacant seats were filled through by-elections.

See also
List of federal by-elections in Canada

Sources
 Parliament of Canada–Elected in By-Elections 

1949 elections in Canada
1948 elections in Canada
1947 elections in Canada
1946 elections in Canada
1945 elections in Canada
20th